The  New York Giants season was the franchise's 88th season in the National Football League (NFL), the ninth under head coach Tom Coughlin and the third playing their home games at MetLife Stadium in East Rutherford, New Jersey. The Giants began the 2012 season as defending Super Bowl Champions for the fourth time in their history, by virtue of their 21–17 victory in Super Bowl XLVI over the New England Patriots, their second Super Bowl victory over the Patriots. The Giants finished 9–7 for the second straight year, but failed to make the playoffs. Like in 2011, the Giants went 3–5 after a 6–2 start. The 2012 Giants were also the first defending Super Bowl champion to miss the playoffs since the 2009 Steelers.

Personnel changes
On February 10, Giants quarterbacks coach Mike Sullivan was hired as the new offensive coordinator of the Tampa Bay Buccaneers. Sullivan was with the Giants since the beginning of Tom Coughlin's tenure as head coach of the Giants, serving as the wide receivers coach from 2004 to 2009 and as quarterbacks coach from 2010 to 2011.

The Giants offensive staff suffered another loss three days later (February 13) when assistant offensive line coach Jack Bicknell Jr. was hired by the Kansas City Chiefs to be their offensive line coach. Bicknell was with the Giants the past three seasons.

Roster changes

Free agents

2012 draft class

NOTES: 
The Giants traded its fifth-round selection (#167 overall) to the Cincinnati Bengals in exchange for linebacker Keith Rivers.

The Giants were awarded an additional fourth-round pick (#131 overall) as a compensatory selection.

Staff

Final roster

Schedule

Preseason

Regular season

Note: Intra-division opponents are in bold text.

Game summaries

Week 1: vs. Dallas Cowboys
NFL Kickoff game

With their Super Bowl XLVI title to defend, the Giants began its 2012 campaign at home in the Annual Kickoff Game against their NFC East foe, the Dallas Cowboys. After a scoreless first quarter, New York struck first in the second quarter with a 22-yard field goal from kicker Lawrence Tynes. The Cowboys would close out the half with quarterback Tony Romo completing a 10-yard touchdown pass to wide receiver Kevin Ogletree.

Dallas added onto its lead in the third quarter as Romo completed a 40-yard touchdown to Ogletree. New York struck back with running back Ahmad Bradshaw's 10-yard touchdown run, but the Cowboys answered with kicker Dan Bailey making a 33-yard field goal. Dallas came right back in the fourth quarter with Romo completing a 34-yard touchdown pass to wide receiver Miles Austin. The Giants tried to rally as Super Bowl XLVI MVP quarterback Eli Manning completed a 9-yard touchdown pass to tight end Martellus Bennett, but the Cowboys' offense ran out the clock and preserved the win.

With the loss, New York began its season at 0–1 and became the first defending Super Bowl Champion team to lose a regular season opener since the Broncos in 1999.

Week 2: vs. Tampa Bay Buccaneers

After a season-opening home loss to the Cowboys, the Giants were looking to win their first game of the season. Although Tampa Bay led the Giants 24–13 at halftime, the Giants rallied in the fourth quarter to score 25 points and win their first game, improving to a 1–1 home record and a 1–1 overall record. A mild controversy erupted on the Giants' final kneel in the closing seconds of the game when Tampa Bay head coach Greg Schiano ordered his defensive linemen to blitz Giants' quarterback Eli Manning, presumably in the hope that this would lead to a forced fumble and subsequent touchdown to steal the victory. However, this did not happen.

Week 3: at Carolina Panthers

The Giants' first road game came against a Carolina Panthers team led by second-year quarterback Cam Newton. It was both teams' only Thursday Night Football appearance of the season. The Giants had no trouble with the Panthers, leading 20–0 at halftime and 36–7 at the end of the game. With the win, the Giants improved to 2–1 and reclaimed a share of the NFC East title with the Philadelphia Eagles, who they would play the following week.

Week 4: at Philadelphia Eagles

The Giants traveled to Philadelphia for a Sunday Night Football showdown against the Eagles. After a defensive first quarter in which neither offense scored any points, the Eagles took a 7–3 lead into halftime. The Giants came back with two touchdowns in the second half, but ultimately lost by two points after a failed long field goal by Lawrence Tynes in the closing seconds of the game. With the loss, the Giants fell to 2–2, the Eagles claimed sole possession of the NFC East title, and the Giants record against the Eagles worsened to 1–8 in their last nine meetings, dating back to the 2008 NFL Season.

Week 5: vs. Cleveland Browns

After a disappointing loss to the Eagles, the Giants returned home for an afternoon game against the Cleveland Browns. Led by rookie quarterback Brandon Weeden, the Browns quickly amassed a 14–0 lead early in the first quarter. However, the Giants retook the lead before halftime and did not sacrifice it again. With the win, the Giants improved to 3–2 and began what would ultimately be a four-game winning streak throughout October.

Week 6: at San Francisco 49ers

The Giants traveled to San Francisco for a rematch of last season's NFC Championship game, in which the Giants won in overtime to advance to Super Bowl XLVI. The San Francisco 49ers were looking to avenge their playoff loss against the Giants, and had just come off back-to-back landslide victories against the Jets and Bills. However, the Giants defense allowed only one field goal and the Giants ultimately won the game 26–3, sending the 49ers to their first and only home loss of the season. Head coach Tom Coughlin also recorded his 86th win with the Giants, surpassing Bill Parcells' previous record of 85 wins during his tenure (1983-1990), and became the 2nd winningest head coach in franchise history, only behind Steve Owen, whom coached the team from 1930-1953.

With the win, the Giants improved to 4–2. Also, with the Eagles' loss to the Lions earlier in the day, the Giants gained sole possession of first place in the NFC East.

Week 7: vs. Washington Redskins

The Giants returned home for another divisional battle, this time against the Washington Redskins. Washington had swept the Giants last year, and drafted quarterback Robert Griffin III with the second overall pick in the 2012 NFL Draft. The Redskins took a three-point lead late in the game, but a 77-yard touchdown pass from Manning to Victor Cruz in the last minutes of the game allowed the Giants to claim the victory. With the win, the Giants improved to 5–2 and won their first NFC East game of the season.

Week 8: at Dallas Cowboys

The Giants visited the Dallas Cowboys, where they hoped to avenge their Week 1 home loss. Although the Giants quickly amassed a 23-point lead, the Cowboys responded with 24 unanswered points to take the lead in the 3rd quarter. The Giants ultimately scored a pair of field goals and held on to win 29–24. With the win, the Giants improved to 6–2 and continued to be unwelcome visitors at Cowboys Stadium, where they are now 4–0.

The game, who's viewing area consisted of much of the northeast coast of the United States, was frequently interrupted by updates on the approach of Hurricane Sandy – a storm that was expected to directly impact the northeast United States that night and the following day.

Week 9: vs. Pittsburgh Steelers

At the time of this game, northern New Jersey (and, indeed, a vast majority of the BosWash area) was recovering from the widespread damage and power outages caused by Hurricane Sandy. Played just days after the storm made landfall on the east coast, the blackouts and flooding even affected the visiting Steelers' travel schedule, and the team would be forced to fly into the area on the morning of the contest as opposed to the usual day beforehand.

Both teams traded possessions through the first quarter before Steelers' wide receiver Emmanuel Sanders caught a 4-yard touchdown pass from quarterback Ben Roethlisberger three minutes into the second period. A Shaun Suisham extra point gave the Steelers a 7–0 lead. The hometown Giants answered, tying up the game with a 1-yard run by Andre Brown. Shortly after, with around five minutes remaining in the half, New York's Osi Umenyiora was able to knock the ball from Roethlisberger's hand as the quarterback was attempting a pass. Giants linebacker Michael Boley took full advantage of the turnover, scooping up the fumble and giving the Giants a 14–7 lead on a 70-yard touchdown return. The Steelers were able to put together a final drive of the half, and a 30-yard field goal by Shaun Suisham narrowed the Giants' lead to four points at the half.

Seven minutes into the third quarter, Giants' kicker Lawrence Tynes extended the home team's lead by three via a 50-yard field goal. With a minute to go in the period, Tynes would successfully convert a 23-yard attempt and give the Giants a ten-point lead with a quarter to play.

A 51-yard touchdown pass from Roethlisberger to Mike Wallace would cut into the Giants' lead less than a minute into the fourth. New York would fail to accumulate any further points in the contest and, despite a botched fake field goal attempt by the Steelers, a 1-yard touchdown run by Pittsburgh back Isaac Redman gave the Steelers the lead and, eventually, the win.

With the loss, the Giants fell to 6–3.

Week 10: at Cincinnati Bengals

The Giants travelled to a cloudy Cincinnati to face the Bengals. The Bengals, who were in the midst of a losing streak, came out strong and handily defeated the Giants 31–13. With the loss, the Giants fell to 6–4 and entered their bye week.

Week 11: Bye Week

Week 12: vs. Green Bay Packers

The Giants hosted the Packers on Sunday Night Football, as quarterbacks Eli Manning and Aaron Rodgers faced each other for the fourth time in three seasons. Although the Packers were expected to avenge their playoff loss from last season, the Giants took a 31–10 lead into halftime and ultimately won the game 38–10, snapping a two-game losing streak and improving to a 7–4 record.

Week 13: at Washington Redskins

Coming off a huge victory over the Packers, the Giants traveled to Washington for their only Monday Night Football appearance of the season. Although the Giants led at halftime, the Redskins scored a touchdown early in the fourth quarter to take a one-point lead. The Giants' offense failed to score any points and the Redskins held on to win 17–16. With the loss, the Giants fell to 7–5 and 2–3 within the NFC East.

Week 14: vs. New Orleans Saints

The Giants returned home to face Drew Brees and the New Orleans Saints, in a game that would turn out to be a breakout game for rookie David Wilson. The first-round draft pick (32nd overall) rushed for a touchdown on a kickoff return and ran for two more scores in a huge win over the Saints. The Giants won 52–27, handing the Saints their eighth loss of the season. With the win, the Giants improved to 8–5 and secured their eighth consecutive non-losing season.

Week 15: at Atlanta Falcons

The Giants traveled to Atlanta to visit the Falcons in their third and final rematch of last season's playoffs. The game took place only two days after the Sandy Hook Elementary School shooting, just an hour's drive from the Giants' practice facility. The Giants honored the victims by wearing "SHES" decals on their helmets, and wide receiver Victor Cruz played in honor of six-year-old Jack Pinto, one of the victims.

The Giants ultimately lost 34–0 and fell to 8–6 overall. However, the loss did not eliminate them from either playoff contention or the NFC East title.

The embarrassing loss was one of three shutouts on the same day, the other two being the Tampa Bay Buccaneers and the Kansas City Chiefs.

Week 16: at Baltimore Ravens

The Giants visited Baltimore, where they were defeated by the Ravens 33–14. With the loss, the Giants fell to 8–7 and were eliminated from contention for the NFC East title. The Giants can still obtain a wild-card berth with a victory against the Eagles and Week 17 victories by the Packers, Lions and Redskins.

Week 17: vs. Philadelphia Eagles
 The Giants would have a lopsided victory 42–7 against the Eagles. However, the Giants would be eliminated from playoff contention with a Bears' victory that same day. This also marked the first time since 2006 that the Giants started the season 6–2 and finished 2–6 ending with a record of 8–8, although the Giants made the playoffs that year in 2006 as a Wild Card Contender, but only this time around they started off 6–2, wind up finishing 3–5 but fail to make the playoffs this season finishing 9–7, and thereby became the eighth consecutive team to be dethroned from their World Championship. However, they took their current trend against their longtime rivals to 2–8 in the last 10 games between the teams.

Standings

Statistics

Team leaders

 stats values are correct.

League rankings
Total Offense (YPG): 371.2 (10th)
Passing (YPG): 256 (9th) 
Rushing (YPG): 114.8 (15th)
Total Defense (YPG): 366.9 (22nd) 
Passing (YPG): 245 (22nd) 
Rushing (YPG): 121.8 (21st)

Stats correct through week 14.

References

External links

New York Giants
New York Giants seasons
New York Giants season
21st century in East Rutherford, New Jersey
Meadowlands Sports Complex